A grain filler (pore filler or paste wood filler) is a woodworking product that is used to achieve a smooth-textured wood finish by filling pores in the wood grain. It is used particularly on open grained woods such as oak, mahogany and walnut where building up multiple layers of standard wood finish is ineffective or impractical.

Composition 
Grain fillers generally consist of three basic components; a binder, a bulking agent and a solvent. The binder is wood finish, and in the case of oil-based fillers is typically a blend of oil and varnish. In the case of water-based fillers, it is acrylic or urethane. The type of binder influences the type of solvent used; oil-based fillers usually use mineral spirits, while water-based fillers use water. Both types of filler use silica as a bulking agent as it resists shrinking and swelling in response to changes in temperature and humidity. Other bulking agents may include quartz powder, wood flour, and talc.

Use 
Woodworkers will use a grain filler before applying other finishes to open grained woods to achieve a "full finish", which is mirror-like. Woods such as ash, oak, mahogany and walnut fall into this category, while tight grained woods such as maple and cherry can achieve a full finish with just a few coats of finish.

Before application, the surface is sanded and puttied to conceal surface imperfections, which would otherwise be made far more obvious by the grain filler. The filler is brushed on both with and against the wood grain and the excess is scraped off. After some drying, the woodworker typically uses a piece of burlap to remove more excess.

References 

Wood finishing materials